George Hamilton-Gordon may refer to:

 George Hamilton-Gordon, 4th Earl of Aberdeen (1784–1860), Peelite politician and British prime minister
 George Hamilton-Gordon, 5th Earl of Aberdeen (1816–1864), Liberal politician
 George Hamilton-Gordon, 6th Earl of Aberdeen (1841–1870), Scottish peer
 George Hamilton-Gordon, 2nd Baron Stanmore (1871–1957), Liberal politician

See also
George Gordon (disambiguation)
Earl of Aberdeen